Pascual Bellizzia Rosique (born 27 January 1964) is a Mexican politician from the Ecologist Green Party of Mexico (. From 2008 to 2009, he was a deputy in the LX Legislature of the Mexican Congress representing Veracruz.

References

1964 births
Living people
Politicians from Veracruz
Ecologist Green Party of Mexico politicians
21st-century Mexican politicians
Deputies of the LX Legislature of Mexico
Members of the Chamber of Deputies (Mexico) for Veracruz